Center Point is an extinct town in Atchison County, in the U.S. state of Missouri. The GNIS classifies it as a populated place, but the precise location of the town site is unknown.

A post office called Center Point was established in 1875, and remained in operation until 1880. The community was named for its central location relative to the township in which it was located.

References

Ghost towns in Missouri
Former populated places in Atchison County, Missouri